A by-election for the seat of Canterbury in the New South Wales Legislative Assembly was held on 12 November 2016. The by-election was triggered by the resignation of Labor MP and former interim Labor leader Linda Burney on 6 May to contest the division of Barton at the 2016 federal election.

By-elections for the seats of Orange and Wollongong were held on the same day.

Background
In its second incarnation from 1927, the electoral district of Canterbury has been held by the Labor Party, excepting between 1932 and 1935 when Edward Hocking held the seat for the United Australia Party following the Lang dismissal crisis.

Linda Burney was elected to represent Canterbury at the 2003 state election, becoming the first Aboriginal person to serve in the New South Wales Parliament. Burney was most recently re-elected to the seat at the 2015 state election with a margin of 15.7, making Canterbury a safe seat for the Labor Party. On 29 February 2016, Burney indicated that she would be seeking preselection for the federal seat of Barton in the upcoming federal election, and would resign from the assembly if successful. In March, the NSW branch of the Labor Party referred the preselection decisions for the federal seats of Barton and Hunter, and Canterbury, to the party's national executive. Sophie Cotsis, a member of the Legislative Council since 2010, was preselected.

Dates

Candidates
The three candidates in ballot paper order are as follows:

Results

Linda Burney resigned.

See also
Electoral results for the district of Canterbury
List of New South Wales state by-elections

References

External links
New South Wales Electoral Commission: Canterbury State By-election
ABC Elections: Canterbury By-election

2016 elections in Australia
New South Wales state by-elections